The Ministry of Industry and Commerce is a government ministry, responsible for trade in Zimbabwe and industrial policy. The incumbent minister is Welshman Ncube and the deputy minister is Michael Bimha. Its oversees:
 National Incomes and Pricing Commission

Ministers 

 Obert Mpofu
 Welshman Ncube

References

Government of Zimbabwe
Economy of Zimbabwe
Zimbabwe
Zimbabwe